The Tsauchab is an ephemeral river in the Hardap Region of central Namibia. Its source is in the southern Naukluft Mountains, from where it flows westwards through the Namib-Naukluft National Park into Sossusvlei, an endorheic basin. The lower river has in the past had a slightly different courses and also formed two other basins, the Deadvlei and the Hiddenvlei. 

Since it is in the Namib Desert, the Tsauchab carries water only during the rare times when rain falls in the Naukluft Mountains and runs off, since it cannot seep into the soil fast enough (see flash flood). During these rains, the Tsauchab becomes a rapid-running, strong river within a matter of hours. Past the canyon, the Tsauchab flattens and grows broader, and is surrounded by a riparian forest as it slopes towards the Sossusvlei salt pan. In the Sossusvlei area, the riparian forest consists of both the living trees including Maerua crassifolia and the remaining skeletons of dead trees.

Sossusvlei, Sesriem Canyon and the high sand dunes between the two are some of Namibia's major tourist attractions.

External links
 Tsauchab River and Sossus Vlei Lakebed, Namibia at the NASA Earth Observatory website

References

Rivers of Namibia
Geography of Hardap Region
Namib-Naukluft National Park